The South Africa national under-18 basketball team represents South Africa in international under-18 (under age 18) basketball competitions. The team is administered by Basketball South Africa.

See also
South Africa men's national basketball team
South Africa men's national under-16 basketball team
South Africa women's national basketball team
South Africa women's national under-18 basketball team
South Africa women's national under-16 basketball team

References

External links
Archived records of South Africa team participations

Men's national under-18 basketball teams
basketball